The US Army Ordnance Technical Intelligence Agency (OTIA) was a small special-purpose intelligence agency assigned to the Chief of Ordnance in the Headquarters, Department of the Army. It was established effective 1 September 1957 in Washington, D.C., as the Ordnance Technical Intelligence Agency by DAGO 44, 1957. The Ordnance Technical Intelligence Agency was created with files and personnel previously belonging the intelligence section in the Office of the Chief of Ordnance that had been organized during World War II. The scope and activities of the Intelligence section in the Office of the Chief of Ordnance are described in four semiannual reports available in the National Archives.

The Agency was redesignated the "US Army Ordnance Technical Intelligence Agency" in late 1957 or early 1958.  According to a list of tenants of Arlington Hall Station (AHS), Virginia, in 1958, the agency was relocated to AHS on 6 February 1958.

In 1962, the organization was discontinued, with personnel and files concerned with technical intelligence transferred to The United States Army Foreign Science and Technology Center (FSTC), and the personnel and files concerned with area analysis transferred to the US Army Area Analysis Intelligence Agency. The organization was formally transferred to FSTC by DAGO 46, 1962.

References

 US Army Ordnance Technical Intelligence Agency
Defunct United States intelligence agencies